Dario Marianelli (born 21 June 1963) is an Italian composer known for his frequent collaborations with director Joe Wright.

Early life, education
Marianelli was born in Pisa, Italy. He came from a musically inclined family and learned the piano at an early age. He studied piano and composition in Florence and London. After a year as a postgraduate composer at the Guildhall School of Music, he took up a three-year postgraduate program at the National Film and Television School in London, from which he graduated in 1997. While there, he also undertook diverse projects, composing for concerts, contemporary ballet and theatre productions.

Career
Marianelli had already written scores for several films and TV projects, including movies such as Ailsa and Pandaemonium, when director Joe Wright contacted him about scoring his 2005 film Pride & Prejudice. He subsequently composed for Wright's films Atonement, The Soloist, Anna Karenina and Darkest Hour.

In 2008 Marianelli won the Academy Award for Original Music Score and Golden Globe Award for Best Original Score for Atonement. He has also been nominated for Academy Awards for Pride & Prejudice and Anna Karenina.

In 2018 he composed the score for Bumblebee, the sixth installment in the Transformers film series. It was his second score for director Travis Knight, after Kubo and the Two Strings.

Marianelli has continued to write concert, theatre and ballet music. In a 2019 article on film composing, he said: "Writing music professionally is a hard occupation, and writing for media definitely not for the fainthearted. One has to be able to enjoy the pain, in order to be able to carry on successfully. I think one of the hardest things to deal with, working as a composer involved in media, is the anxiety that comes from being in quite a vulnerable position."

Film scores

Awards and nominations

See also
Broadcast Film Critics Association Award for Best Composer
Chicago Film Critics Association

References

External links
 
mfiles information on Dario Marianelli
Air-Edel Associates

1963 births
20th-century Italian composers
21st-century Italian composers
Best Original Music Score Academy Award winners
Golden Globe Award-winning musicians
Italian film score composers
Italian male composers
Ivor Novello Award winners
Laika (company) people
Living people
Italian male film score composers
People from Pisa
Alumni of the National Film and Television School